Liniya is a cash and carry type hypermarket chain that is owned by Grinn Corporation. As of 2007, according to ''Kommersant' newspaper, it was 21st in Russia's Top 50 Biggest Store/Cash & Carry Chains.

History
On December 6, 2002, the first store of the chain was opened in Kursk. This chain currently owns 27 stores (not counting stores in MegaGrinn shopping mall centers) in 10 oblasts of Russia.

In 2019, the media reported that allegedly 99.9% owned by JSC Corporation "Grinn" was pledged in favor of LLC "Strategy", which is managed by the relatives of one of the co-owners of the holding "Adamant". Nikolai Greshilov denied this information. Prior to this, information appeared that the Bryansk territory "Liniya" stores would be sold, as the company was allegedly preparing for bankruptcy.

References

Hypermarkets
Retail companies established in 2002